Ghazali Rural District is a rural district (dehestan) in Miyan Jolgeh District, Nishapur County, Razavi Khorasan province, Iran. At the 2006 census, its population was 8,835, in 2,180 families.  The rural district has 19 villages.

References 

Rural Districts of Razavi Khorasan Province
Nishapur County